Daniel Felix Hermann (born 12 October 1986) is a German former competitive ice dancer. With his sister, Carolina Hermann, he won six senior international medals and the 2009 German national title. They reached the free dance at three ISU Championships, attaining their best result, tenth, at the 2007 World Junior Championships.

Personal life 
Daniel Felix Hermann was born on 12 October 1986 in Wuppertal, West Germany. He has six siblings, including Carolina Hermann.

Career 
The Hermanns started skating in the winter of 1991 and joined Solinger Turnerbund sports club in 1994. In 1997, they teamed up together and began learning ice dancing, coached by Oleg Ryjkin at the Olympic training centre in Dortmund. They competed on the novice level until the end of the 2002–03 season.

In the 2003–04 season, the Hermanns moved up to the junior ranks. They were given two ISU Junior Grand Prix assignments and finished ninth at both. They continued to appear on the JGP series during the next three seasons. In 2006–07, they won the German junior national title and were sent to the 2007 World Junior Championships in Oberstdorf, Germany, where they finished tenth.

The Hermanns began competing on the senior level in the 2007–08 season. Making their Grand Prix debut, they placed 8th at the 2007 Skate Canada International. They won a silver medal at the Pavel Roman Memorial and bronze at the German Championships.

Since Daniel had to study one term abroad for his degree, they spent the summer of 2008 training in Vancouver under Victor Kraatz and his wife Maikki Uotila-Kraatz. In the 2008–09 season, the Hermanns won the German national title ahead of Nelli Zhiganshina / Alexander Gazsi. They were selected to represent Germany at two ISU Championships and qualified for the free dance at both, finishing 12th at the 2009 Europeans in Helsinki, Finland and 17th at the 2009 Worlds in Los Angeles, California.

In 2009–10, the Hermanns finished second to another sibling duo, Christina Beier / William Beier, at the German Championships and were eliminated from the World Championships in Turin, Italy after placing 22nd in the short dance.

The Hermanns missed the 2010–11 season due to injury and returned to the ice in March 2011, working with Rene Lohse in Berlin. 2011–12 would be their final season. They won bronze medals at the 2011 Pavel Roman Memorial, 2011 NRW Trophy, and 2012 German Championships and then retired from competition.

Programs 
(with Carolina Hermann)

Results 
(with Hermann)

GP: Grand Prix; JGP: Junior Grand Prix

References

External links

 
 Official site

German male ice dancers
1986 births
Living people
Sportspeople from Wuppertal
Competitors at the 2009 Winter Universiade